Tufnell may refer to:

People
 Carleton Tufnell (1856–1940), English cricketer
 Edward Carleton Tufnell (1806–1886), English civil servant and educationalist
 Edward Wyndham Tufnell (1814–1896), Australian bishop
 Harry Tufnell (1886–1959), English footballer 
 Henry Tufnell (1805–1854), British politician
 Meriel Patricia Tufnell (1948–2002), English jockey
 Neville Tufnell (1887–1951), English cricketer and soldier
 Olga Tufnell (1905–1985), British archaeologist
 Phil Tufnell (born 1966), English cricketer
 Richard Tufnell (1896–1956), English politician

Places
 Tufnell Park, north London, England

See also
 Nigel Tufnel, fictional character in 1984 American film This Is Spinal Tap